2015–16 Syed Mushtaq Ali Trophy is the seventh season of the Syed Mushtaq Ali Trophy, a Twenty20 cricket tournament in India. It is contested by 27 domestic cricket teams of India. Group A consisted of Gujarat, Himachal Pradesh, Hyderabad, Bengal, Tamil Nadu, Haryana and Vidarbha.

Round 1

Round 2

Round 3

Round 4

Round 5

Round 6

Round 7

References

Syed Mushtaq Ali Trophy Group A
Syed Mushtaq Ali Trophy Group A